St. Peter's in the Loop, on Madison between LaSalle and Clark in Chicago, Illinois, was built in 1953.  It was designed by architects Vitzthum & Burns.

The St. Peter's church was founded in 1846.  Its first building was constructed in 1865.

The current building's front facade features a crucifix titled "Christ of the Loop", designed by Latvian sculptor Arvid Strauss, executed by Chicago artist J. Watts.

References

Roman Catholic churches in Chicago